Antarès is an indoor sporting arena that is located in Le Mans, France. The arena is located inside the Circuit de la Sarthe, home of the famous 24 Hours of Le Mans, and adjacent to the first right kink on the Mulsanne Straight. The seating capacity of the arena, which was inaugurated in 1995, is 6,023 people when configured for basketball games.

History
Antarès has been used as the home arena of the Le Mans Sarthe Basket professional basketball team of the French LNB Pro A league. It served as one of the host arenas for the FIBA EuroBasket 1999.

References

External links
Official Site 

Indoor arenas in France
Basketball venues in France
Sports venues in Sarthe
Sports venues completed in 1995
1995 establishments in France